Events in the year 1796 in India.

Incumbents
 John Shore, 1st Baron Teignmouth, Governor-General, 1793–96.
 Marquess Cornwallis, Governor-General, 1796–98 (also 1786–93 and 1805)

Events
 National income - 11,055 million

References

 
India
Years of the 18th century in India